Harmonic scale may refer to:

Harmonic Scale
Harmonic minor scale
Harmonic major scale

See also
Scale of harmonics